Bettina Sellmann (born 1971) is a German artist.

From 1992 to 1997 Sellmann studied and graduated as Meisterschülerin (Master) at Städelschule Frankfurt. In 1999 she was awarded a DAAD grant for New York City, where she lived and worked until 2009. She currently lives and works in Berlin, Germany. Sellmann also holds a Master of Fine Arts degree from Hunter College, NYC.

In her paintings Sellmann uses a watercolor-on-canvas technique in "candy colored acrylic tones (bonbonbunte Acryltöne)" and “multi-layers of translucent pigments in pale pinks, powder blues, and acidic yellows and greens“.
Works of her have been described as “see-through versions of Old Master paintings ... gone translucent and ethereal“, "particular reverie-inducers“, exploring “the other side of pink“.

Recent paintings deal with kidult and fairy tale "romanticism“ (Cassandra Neyenesch) as well as kawaii imagery and influences of Far Eastern spirituality.

At Wonderloch Kellerland Berlin in 2011 she performed a space clearing, which could be considered either an empty room or "a purely transcendent exhibition“.

She has works in private and public collections, such as the Museum of Modern Art, New York, which holds her drawing "The Saints in This World Are Watching" (2003).  7

Awards

DAAD (German Academic Exchange Service) - Grant

Skowhegan Summer Residency Program

Exhibitions

Solo exhibitions

 2017 Hello Color, Gilla Lörcher I Contemporary Art, Berlin, Germany 
 2016 It´s already there, Gilla Lörcher I Contemporary Art, Berlin, Germany
 2015 US Paintings, Gilla Lörcher I Contemporary Art, Berlin, Germany 
 2015 Spiral, Square and Dickie-Bow, Wolfstädter Galerie, Frankfurt, Germany
 2013 To Queen Luise & Young-Wilhelm, Wonderloch Kellerland, Berlin, Germany
 2013 Magic Every Day, Gilla Lörcher I Contemporary Art, Berlin, Germany
 2011 Bettina Sellmann @ Kaisersaal, ISI/Potsdamer Platz, Berlin, Germany
 2011 Templeloch Space Clearing, Wonderloch Kellerland, Berlin, Germany
 2009 Taina, cosmogeny, make your own paper dragon, Derek Eller Gallery, New York, NY, USA
 2007 Galerie Frank Schlag, Essen, Germany
 2006 Derek Eller Gallery, New York, NY, USA
 2004 Armor & Etiquette, Derek Eller Gallery, New York, NY, USA 
 2004 Drawings, Derek Eller Gallery, New York, NY, USA

Group exhibitions

 2018 Diaikone, Weißfrauenkirche, Frankfurt am Main, Germany 
 2016 Animalism, Galerie Bernd Kugler, Innsbruck, Austria
 2016 Blanke Teile, Malerinnennetzwerk Berlin-Leipzig, Schaufenster, Berlin, Germany
 2015 1. Berlin Edition, Salon Dahlmann, Berlin, Germany
 2014 Die Leipziger Edition, Wiensowski & Harbord, Berlin, Germany
 2014 Painting Was A Lady, Wonderloch Kellerland, New York City, USA
 2013 Berlin–Klondyke, Spinnerei Leipzig, Germany
 2012 Everywhere and Nowhere, Works from the Collection Reydan Weiss - Kunsthaus Villa Jauss, Oberstdorf, Germany
 2012 Alptraum, Green Papaya Art Project, Metropolitan Museum of Manila, Manila
 2012 Painting Was A Lady, Vienna Art Foundation, Kunstraum am Schauplatz, Vienna, Austria
 2011 Soiree Matinee, Wonderloch Kellerland, Los Angeles, USA
 2010 Talk Show, Edward Thorp Gallery, New York, NY, USA
 2009 Drawn, Kinkead Contemporary, Los Angeles, CA, USA
 2009 Figuratively Seeing, Massachusetts College of Art and Design, Boston, MA, USA
 2009 Tales of Wonder and Woe, Castle Gallery, New Rochelle, NY, USA
 2008 The Golden Record, The Collective Gallery, Edinburgh, UK
 2006 Flicker, University Art Museum, Albany, NY, USA
 2005 Hello Sunday, Sixtyseven/Thierry Goldberg Gallery, New York, NY, USA
 2004 Under the Sun, Greener Pastures Gallery, Toronto, Canada 
 2003 Girls Gone Wild, Bronwyn Keenan Gallery, New York, NY, USA
 2002 Fredericks Freiser Gallery, New York, NY, USA
 2001 Groupshow, American Fine Arts, New York, NY, USA

References
 Museum of Modern Art / New York
 Skowhegan Art Registry
 MassArt Massachusetts College of Art and Design
 Wonderloch Kellerland Berlin

Further reading

New American Paintings, #74, Volume 13, Issue 1, The Open Studio Press, USA, February/March 2008 
ISSN 1066-2235

Remastered, Sebastien Agneessens (Ed.), Die Gestalten Verlag, Berlin 2006

Bettina Sellmann, Galerie Kollmeier Essen (Werden), 2003 

Susan M. Canning, Tales of Wonder and Woe, Castle Gallery, New Rochelle, NY, USA, December 2008

Roberta Smith, Girls Gone Wild, The New York Times, Art in Review, NYC, USA, July 4, 2003, page B-29

Notes

External links
 Artist's website
 ArtFacts.net information on Bettina Sellmann

1971 births
Living people
Contemporary painters
Artists from Berlin